Central Station is the common English name for two different transport facilities in Montreal:

Central Station, the city's intercity railway station and a commuter train station; 
Station Centrale d'Autobus Montreal, the city's intercity bus terminal.